The Virgin and Child with Saints is an oil on canvas painting attributed to Cima da Conegliano, created in 1513-1518, now in the National Gallery, London, to which it was bequeathed in 1916.

References

1510s paintings
Paintings of the Madonna and Child by Cima da Conegliano
Collections of the National Gallery, London
Paintings depicting John the Apostle
Paintings of Saint Nicholas